Pete Eberling (April 19, 1952 – June 24, 2007) was an American speed skater. He competed in four events at the 1972 Winter Olympics.

References

1952 births
2007 deaths
American male speed skaters
Olympic speed skaters of the United States
Speed skaters at the 1972 Winter Olympics
Sportspeople from Vienna